The Mauritanian ambassador in Beijing is the official representative of the Government in Nouakchott to the Government of China.

List of representatives

References 

 
China
Mauritania